Agonopterix dumitrescui is a moth of the family Depressariidae. It is found in Romania.

References

Moths described in 1965
Endemic fauna of Romania
Agonopterix
Moths of Europe